The Pacific gull (Larus pacificus) is a very large gull, native to the coasts of Australia. It is moderately common between Carnarvon in the west, and Sydney in the east, although it has become scarce in some parts of the south-east, as a result of competition from the kelp gull, which has "self-introduced" since the 1940s.

Much larger than the ubiquitous silver gull, and nowhere near as common, Pacific gulls are usually seen alone or in pairs, loafing around the shoreline, steadily patrolling high above the edge of the water, or (sometimes) zooming high on the breeze to drop a shellfish or sea urchin onto rocks.

Diet 
The gulls' diet consists of a number various fish species and invertebrates. They frequently consume crabs, most often the species Ovalipes australiensis and Paragrapsus gaimardii. They also commonly eat Platycephalus bassensis (sand flatheads) and cephalopods, both of which are sourced from their regular consumption of waste from fish which have been cleaned on wharves and beaches. Additionally, they may eat insects, eggs, and other seabirds.

The gulls may be found scavenging abattoirs and in rubbish tips, where they will often steal food from other birds.

Taxonomy
The Pacific gull was first described by English ornithologist John Latham in 1801 from a Thomas Watling drawing, where the local name had been recorded as Troo-gad-dill. Its specific epithet refers to the Pacific Ocean.

Two subspecies are recognised: the nominate race L. p. pacificus from the south-east coast and Tasmania, and L. p. georgii from South Australia and Western Australia.

Description

Pacific gulls are the only large gulls in their range, besides the occasional kelp gull. This species is mostly white, with dark wings and back, and a very thick (when compared to other gull species), powerful, red-tipped yellow bill. They have salt glands that secrete salty water through the nostrils. Young birds are mottled-brown all over, and attain their adult plumage only gradually; by its fourth year, a young Pacific gull has usually become difficult to tell apart from an adult bird.

Of the two subspecies, the nominate eastern race prefers sheltered beaches, and the western race L. p. georgii is commonly found even on exposed shores. Both subspecies nest in pairs or loose colonies on offshore islands, making a cup of grasses and sticks in an exposed position, and laying two or three mottled brown eggs.

References

Pacific gull
Birds of South Australia
Birds of Tasmania
Birds of Victoria (Australia)
Birds of Western Australia
Endemic birds of Australia
Pacific gull
Pacific gull